The 1991 NCAA Division I Cross Country Championships were the 53rd annual NCAA Men's Division I Cross Country Championship and the 11th annual NCAA Women's Division I Cross Country Championship to determine the team and individual national champions of NCAA Division I men's and women's collegiate cross country running in the United States. In all, four different titles were contested: men's and women's individual and team championships.

Held on November 25, 1991, the combined meet was hosted by the University of Arizona at El Conquistador Country Club in Tucson, Arizona. The distance for the men's race was 10 kilometers (6.21 miles) while the distance for the women's race was 5 kilometers (3.11 miles). 

The men's team national championship was again won by Arkansas, their fifth (and second consecutive) team national title. The individual championship was won by Sean Dollman, from Western Kentucky, with a time of 30:17.1.

The women's team national championship was likewise retained by Villanova, their third national title. VIllanova's Sonia O'Sullivan also repeated as individual national champion with a time of 16:30.3.

Qualification
All Division I cross country teams were eligible to qualify for the meet through their placement at various regional qualifying meets. In total, 22 teams and 177 runners contested the men's championship while 22 teams and 179 runners contested the women's title.

Men's title
Distance: 10,000 meters (6.21 miles)
Competitors: 22 teams, 177 runners
Full Results: MileSplit.com

Men's Team Result (Top 10)

(H) – Host team

Men's Individual Result (Top 10)
Runners in italics were not competing with their full team

Women's title
Distance: 5,000 meters (3.11 miles)
Competitors: 22 teams, 179 runners
Full Results: MileSplit.com

Women's Team Result (Top 10)

(H) – Host team

Women's Individual Result (Top 10)
Runners in italics were not competing with their full team

References
 

NCAA Cross Country Championships
NCAA Division I Cross Country Championships
NCAA Division I Cross Country Championships
NCAA Division I Cross Country Championships
Sports in Tucson, Arizona
Track and field in Arizona
University of Arizona
Events in Tucson, Arizona